Albert "Lal" White (19 February 1890 – 1 March 1965) was a British cyclist. He competed in two events at the 1920 Summer Olympics winning a silver medal in the men's team pursuit.

White was the subject of a 2012 Cultural Olympiad community opera called Cycle Song.  It was composed by Tim Sutton and the librettist was Ian McMillan. The Scunthorpe Co-operative Junior Choir, Proper Job Theatre Company and over a thousand locals participated.

References

1890 births
1965 deaths
British male cyclists
Olympic cyclists of Great Britain
Cyclists at the 1920 Summer Olympics
Olympic silver medallists for Great Britain
Olympic medalists in cycling
Medalists at the 1920 Summer Olympics
People from Brigg